Bernard Tschumi (born 25 January 1944 in Lausanne, Switzerland) is an architect, writer, and educator, commonly associated with deconstructivism. Son of the well-known Swiss architect Jean Tschumi and a French mother, Tschumi is a dual French-Swiss national who works and lives in New York City and Paris. He studied in Paris and at ETH in Zurich, where he received his degree in architecture in 1969.

Career
Tschumi has taught in the UK and the USA; at Portsmouth University in Portsmouth and the Architectural Association in London, the Institute for Architecture and Urban Studies in New York, Princeton University, the Cooper Union in New York and Columbia University where he was Dean of the Graduate School of Architecture, Planning and Preservation from 1988 to 2003. Tschumi is a permanent US resident.

Tschumi's first notable project was the Parc de la Villette, a competition project he won in 1983. Other projects include the new Acropolis Museum, Rouen Concert Hall, and bridge in La Roche-sur-Yon. Over his almost forty-year career, his built accomplishments number over sixty, including theoretical projects.

Tschumi studied at the Swiss Federal Institute of Technology in Zürich, Switzerland where he received an architecture degree in 1969. After school and prior to winning the Parc de La Villette competition, he built his reputation as a theorist through his writings and drawings. From 1988 to 2003 he was the Dean of Columbia University's Graduate School of Architecture, Planning and Preservation. He's held teaching positions at Princeton University, Cooper Union, and the Architectural Association in London. In 1996, he received the French Grand Prix National d'Architecture. He established his practice in 1983 in Paris with the Parc de La Villette competition commission. In 1988, he opened Bernard Tschumi Architects (BTA), headquartered in New York City. In 2002, Bernard Tschumi urbanistes Architectes (BtuA) was established in Paris.

Theory

1960s–70s 
Throughout his career, Bernard Tschumi's work has reevaluated architecture's role in the practice of personal and political freedom. Since the 1970s, Tschumi has argued that there is no fixed relationship between architectural form and the events that take place within it.  The ethical and political imperatives that inform his work emphasize the establishment of a proactive architecture which non-hierarchically engages balances of power through programmatic and spatial devices. In Tschumi's theory, architecture's role is not to express an extant social structure, but to function as a tool for questioning that structure and revising it.

The experience of the May 1968 uprisings and the activities of the Situationist International oriented Tschumi's approach to design studios and seminars he taught at the Architectural Association in London during the early 1970s. Within that pedagogical context he combined film and literary theory with architecture, expanding on the work of such thinkers as Roland Barthes and Michel Foucault, in order to reexamine architecture's responsibility in reinforcing unquestioned cultural narratives. A big influence on this work were the theories and structural diagramming by the Russian cinematographer Sergei Eisenstein produced for his own films. Tschumi adapted Eisenstein's diagrammatic methodology in his investigations to exploit the interstitial condition between the elements of which a system is made of: space, event, and movement (or activity). Best exemplified in his own words as, "the football player skates across the battlefield." In this simple statement he was highlighting the dislocation of orientation and any possibility of a singular reading; a common resultant of the post-structuralist project.

This approach unfolded along two lines in his architectural practice: first, by exposing the conventionally defined connections between architectural sequences  and  the spaces, programs, and movement which produce and reiterate these sequences; and second, by  inventing  new associations between space and the events that 'take place' within it through processes of defamiliarization, de-structuring, superimposition, and cross programming.

Tschumi's work in the later 1970s was refined through courses he taught at the Architectural Association and projects such as The Screenplays (1977) and The Manhattan Transcripts (1981) and evolved from montage techniques taken from film and techniques of the nouveau roman.   His use of event montage as a technique for the organization of program (systems of space, event, and movement, as well as visual and formal techniques) challenged the work other contemporary architects were conducting which focused on montage techniques as purely formal strategies.   Tschumi's work responded as well to prevalent strands of contemporary architectural theory that had reached a point of closure, either through a misunderstanding of post-structuralist thought, or the failure of the liberal/leftist dream of successful political and cultural revolution. For example, Superstudio, one such branch of theoretically oriented architectural postmodernists, began to produce ironic, unrealizable projects such as the 1969 Continuous Monument project, which functioned as counter design and critique of the existing architecture culture, suggesting the end of architecture's capacity to effect change on an urban or cultural scale. Tschumi positioned his work to suggest alternatives to this endgame.

In 1978 he published an essay entitled The Pleasure of Architecture in which he used sexual intercourse as a characterizing analogy for architecture. He claimed that architecture by nature is fundamentally useless, setting it apart from "building". He demands a glorification of architectural uselessness in which the chaos of sensuality and the order of purity combine to form structures that evoke the space in which they are built. He distinguishes between the forming of knowledge and the knowledge of form, contending that architecture is too often dismissed as the latter when it can often be used as the former. Tschumi used this essay as a precursor to a later eponymous series of writings detailing the so-called limits of architecture.

1980s–90s 

Tschumi's winning entry for the 1982 Parc de la Villette Competition in Paris became his first major public work and made possible an implementation of the design research and theory which had been rehearsed in The Manhattan Transcripts and The Screenplays.  Landscaping, spatial and programmatic sequences in the park were used to produce sites of alternative social practice that challenged the expected use values usually reinforced by a large urban park in Paris.

Tschumi has continued this design agenda in a variety of design competitions and built projects since 1983. The 1986 Tokyo National Theater and Opera House project continued the research that Tschumi began in The Manhattan Transcripts, importing notational techniques from experimental dance and musical scores, and using the design process itself to challenge habitual ways of thinking about space, in contrast to earlier static, two dimensional representational techniques which delineated the outline of a building but not the intensity of life within it.  At a local scale in his 1990 Video Pavilion at Groningen, transparent walls and tilted floors produce an intense dislocation of the subject in relation to norms like wall, interior and exterior, and horizon.  At the urban scale in such projects as the 1992 Le Fresnoy, Studio National des Arts Contemporains, in Tourcoing, France, and the 1995 architecture school at Marne la Vallee, France (both completed 1999), larger spaces challenge normative program sequence and accepted use. The Le Fresnoy complex accomplishes this by its use of the space between the roofs of existing buildings and an added, huge umbrella roof above them which creates an interstitial zone of program on ramps and catwalks.  This zone is what Tschumi calls the in-between, a negation of pure form or style that had been practiced in the 1989 ZKM Karlsruhe competition project, where a large atrium space punctuated by encapsulated circulation and smaller program episodes developed a more local network of interstitial space.

The capacity of an overlap of programs to effect a reevaluation of architecture on an urban scale had also been tested in the 1988 Kansai Airport competition, Lausanne Bridge city, and 1989 Bibliothèque de France competition.  In the Bibliothèque de France, a major aspect of the proposed scheme was a large public running track and sports facility on the roof of the complex, intersecting with upper floors of the library program so that neither the sports program nor the intellectual program could exist without an impact on the other.

With these projects Tschumi opposed the methods used by architects for centuries to geometrically evaluate facade and plan composition. In this way he suggested that habitual routines of daily life could be more effectively challenged by a full spectrum of design tactics ranging from shock to subterfuge: by regulating events,  a more subtle and sophisticated regime of defamiliarizations was produced than by aesthetic and symbolic systems of shock. The extreme limit-conditions of architectural program became criteria to evaluate a building's capacity to function as a device capable of social organization.

2010s 

Tschumi's critical understanding of architecture remains at the core of his practice today.  By arguing  that there is no space without event, he designs conditions for a reinvention of living, rather than repeating established aesthetic or symbolic conditions of design. Through these means architecture becomes a  frame for  "constructed situations," a notion informed by the theory, city mappings and urban designs of  the Situationist International.

Responding to the absence of ethical structure and the disjunction between use, form, and social values by which he characterizes the postmodern condition, Tschumi's design research encourages a wide range of  narratives and ambiences to emerge and to self organize. Although his conclusion is that no essentially meaningful relationship exists between a space and the events which occur within it,  Tschumi nonetheless aligns his work with Foucault's notion that social structures should be evaluated not according to an a priori notion of good or evil but for their danger to each other.  In this way, Tschumi's work is ethologically motivated, in the sense that Deleuze uses the term to propose an emergent ethics that depends on a reevaluation of self/identity and body. Freedom is thus defined by the enhanced range of capacity of this extended body/self in conjunction with an extended self-awareness.  By advocating recombinations of program, space, and cultural narrative, Tschumi asks the user to critically reinvent him/herself as a subject.

Tschumi, well known for his radical theories on post-structuralist architecture in the 1960s and '70s, won the commission for the New Acropolis Museum in a competition. The museum offers a seemingly placid stance, focused on the impressive Athenian light and landscape while remaining precise in imagination and sophisticated in form.

Criticism
Tschumi's work has been criticized for sacrificing human needs for intellectual purposes. Most currently, the Greek mathematician Nikos Salingaros claims that the New Acropolis Museum clashes with the traditional architecture of Athens and continues to unnecessarily threaten historical buildings nearby. Other critics praised the Museum:

"It is very contextual and powerfully respectful of the urban fabric of Athens while doing a dance around the ruins."  Comments of the AIA Honor Award Jury writing in 2011.

"a quiet work…a building that is both an enlightening meditation on the Parthenon and a mesmerizing work in its own right." New York Times critic Nicolai Ouroussoff

"A geometrical marvel dedicated to the celebration of antiquity…a purposefully, rather than gratuitously, dynamic building." Jonathan Glancey, Guardian

Critic Christopher Hume wrote "Tschumi's building is impressive and fully engaged. It is thoroughly 21st-century, but it is not starchitecture, or anything like it. Rather, it's an elegant and thoughtful building intended to serve the collection it contains – a model of architectural restraint, if not self-effacement."

Buildings

Completed

 Parc de la Villette, Paris, France (1983–98)
 Alfred Lerner Hall, Columbia University, New York City (1999)
 New Acropolis Museum, Athens, Greece (2002–08)
 FIU School of Architecture, Florida International University, Miami, Florida (2003)
 Vacheron Constantin Headquarters, Geneva, Switzerland (2004)
 Lindner Athletic Center, University of Cincinnati, Cincinnati, Ohio (2006)
 Blue Condominium, 105 Norfolk Street in the Lower East Side of New York City (2007)
 Limoges Concert Hall, France (2007)
 Paris Zoo, France (2014)
 Paul & Henri Carnal Hall, Institut Le Rosey, Rolle, Switzerland (2014)
 The Hague Passage, Netherlands (2014)
 Alésia MuséoParc, Dijon, France (2013)
le fresnoy contemporary art center (1997)

Proposed
 Alésia, Archeo Museum, Dijon, France (2018)
 Elliptic City: International Financial Center of the Americas, Guayacanes, Dominican Republic (completion after 2008)

Works
 1979. Architecturalmanifestals, London, Architectural Association.
 1985. a Case Vide: la Villette.
 1987. CinegramFolie: Le Parc de la Villette.
 1996. Architecture and Disjunctions: Collected Essays 1975–1990, MIT Press, London.
 1994. Event Cities (Praxis), MIT Press, London.
 1994. Architecture and Disjunction, Cambridge, MIT Press
 1994. The Manhattan Transcripts, London, Academy Editions.
 1997. in "AP" (Architectural Profile), Monograph, vol.1, n.4, Jan/Feb.
 1999. A. Guiheux, B. Tschumi, J. Abram, S. Lavin, A. Fleischer, A. Pelissier, D. Rouillard, S. Agacinski, V. Descharrieres, Tschumi Le Fresnoy: Architecture In/Between, Monacelli Press.
 2003. (with Todd Gannon, Laurie A. Gunzleman, Jeffrey Kipnis Damasus A. Winzen) Bernard Tschumi / Zenith De Rouen. Source Books in Architecture, New York, Princeton Architectural Press.
 2003. Universe, New York.
 2004. Veronique Descharrieres, Luca Merlini, Bernard Tschumi Architects: Virtuael, Actar.
 2005. Event-Cities 3 : Concept vs. Context vs. Content, MIT Press.
 2006. Bernard Tschumi: Conversations with Enrique Walker, Monacelli Press.

Notes and references

 Fontana-Giusti, Gordana K. (2016) 'The Landscape of the Mind: A Conversation with Bernard Tschumi', in Architecture and Culture, Volume 4, 2016 - Issue 2: London: Taylor&Francis, 263-280.  (Print)  (Online) 
 Orlandoni, Alessandra "Interview with Bernard Tschumi" - The Plan 010, June 2005

External links

Bernard Tschumi Miami School of Architecture Photo Gallery
Review of T's design for Parc de la Villette
Transform – FOLIES – PARC DE LA VILLETTE
Official site of the Acropolis Museum
Interview with Scraper Magazine

1944 births
Deconstructivism
Living people
People from Lausanne
Swiss architecture writers
20th-century French architects
20th-century Swiss architects
Columbia University faculty
ETH Zurich alumni
Princeton University faculty
Academics of the University of Portsmouth
Officiers of the Légion d'honneur
Columbia Graduate School of Architecture, Planning and Preservation faculty